Guy Le Strange (24 July 1854 – 24 December 1933) was a British Orientalist noted especially for his work in the field of the historical geography of the pre-modern Middle Eastern and Eastern Islamic lands, and his editing of Persian geographical texts. He was a scholar of the Persian, Arabic, and Spanish languages.

Le Strange was one of the original trustees of the E. J. W. Gibb Memorial, an organisation which since 1905 has published the Gibb Memorial Series.

He was born in Brussels, Belgium, the youngest child of Henry L'Estrange Styleman Le Strange of Hunstanton Hall, Norfolk, educated at Clifton College and died in Cambridge.

Works

Books

  
  
 
  
  + Index

Articles

References

1854 births
1933 deaths
English orientalists
People from Hunstanton
People educated at Clifton College
Alumni of the Royal Agricultural University
Historical geography
Iranologists
Arabists
Le Strange family